The 2013 Lafayette Leopards football team represented Lafayette College in the 2013 NCAA Division I FCS football season. The Leopards were led by 14th year head coach Frank Tavani and played their home games at Fisher Stadium. They were a member of the Patriot League. They finished the season 5–7, 4–1 in Patriot League play to finish win the Patriot League championship. They received the league's automatic bid to the FCS Playoffs where they lost in the first round to New Hampshire.

Schedule

References

Lafayette
Lafayette Leopards football seasons
Patriot League football champion seasons
Lafayette
Lafayette Leopards football